= Asia Innovations Group =

Singaporean mobile phone company

- Industry: Mobile Social Company
- Founded: 2013; 12 years ago in Singapore, Asia
- Founders: Andy Tian; Ouyang Yun
- Headquarters: Singapore, Singapore
- Number of locations: 18 offices worldwide
- Area served: Around the world
- Products: Uplive; Lamour; CuteU; Haya
- Website: asiainnovations.com

Asia Innovations Group Limited (ASIG) is a mobile social company based in Singapore. ASIG has an integrated portfolio of social, gaming and e-commerce platforms including apps such as Uplive, the live video platform, CuteU and Lamour, the live dating apps, and Haya, live voice social app.

== History ==
Asia Innovations Group (ASIG) was founded in 2013 by Andy Tian and Ouyang Yun. It currently has eighteen offices in cities including Cairo, Delhi, Tokyo, Taipei, Jakarta, Hong Kong, Ho Chi Minh City, and Los Angeles.

ASIG's focus is on serving users from the Major Emerging Markets (MEMs) including Southeast Asia, Middle East, North Africa, and Latin America.

As of July 2023, ASIG has more than 700 million users for all of its apps from over 150 countries and regions around the world.

== Social apps ==
=== Uplive ===
Uplive is a social platform for audio and video livestreaming. As of October 2022, it has more than 300 million registered users in over 150 countries. Uplive ranks #1 in Taiwan and few Arab countries among live streaming apps. In partnership with Google, Uplive provides real-time text-to-text and speech-to-text translations for more than 120 languages in the world.

=== CuteU ===
It is a live dating app that incorporates real-time video matching.

=== Lamour ===
It is also a live dating app that connects people through real-time voice, video and text messages. It was founded in 2019, the same year; it stood No. 7 and No. 12, respectively, in Google Play's non-gaming app ranking list. The same year it ranked in the list of the top 10 apps by revenue in seven countries in the region. Lamour connects users without any language barrier, that is, its AI based algorithm translates the language of the users to each other.

== Funding and growth ==
In September 2022, ASIG announced that it would go public in USA via SPAC with a merger with Magnum Opus Acquisition. The merger is expected to bring cash of $200 million for ASIG.
